Type 59 may refer to:

Type 59 tank, Chinese main battle tank
Type 59, Chinese copy of the Makarov 9 mm PM pistol
130 mm towed field gun M1954 (M-46) (Chinese copy: Type 59-1)
57 mm AZP S-60 (Chinese copy: 57 mm Type 59 Heavy anti-aircraft gun)
KS-19 (Chinese copy: 100 mm Type 59 medium anti-aircraft gun)
A Chinese clone of the Soviet RGD-5 fragmentation grenade
Bugatti Type 59 racing car of the 1930s